Goodbye was the third and final song from Kate Ryan's second studio album Stronger, and her eighth single.  This song was released in November 2004. It was the third most successful song from Stronger next to "Only If I" and "The Promise You Made".

Formats and track listings
 Belgian CD single
"Goodbye" - 3:21
"Goodbye" (Instrumental) - 3:21
"Goodbye" (Music Video)
 German CD single
"Goodbye" - 3:21
"Goodbye" (Instrumental) - 3:21

References

2004 songs
2004 singles
Kate Ryan songs
Songs written by Phil Wilde
Songs written by Kate Ryan
EMI Records singles